Bridget Carleton (born May 22, 1997) is a Canadian professional basketball player for the Minnesota Lynx of the Women's National Basketball Association (WNBA). She played college basketball for the Iowa State Cyclones and competed internationally with the Canada national team.

She participated at the 2018 FIBA Women's Basketball World Cup.

On March 14, 2019, Carleton was named second-team All-American by ESPN.

In her career playing at Iowa State University, she finished 2nd in the Cyclones' records for career scoring with 2,142 points. She ranks third in three areas: field goals with 713, steals with 211, and blocked shots with 124.

Iowa State statistics 

Source

Canadian National Team
Carleton first played for Team Canada at the 2013 U16 FIBA Americas. She was named team captain, led the squad in minutes, and helped Canada to a Silver Medal. She also was a part of the U17 Ontario Team, which won Gold at the 2013 Canada Games. Carleton also played with the junior team that won silver at the U18 FIBA Americas. 

Carleton joined the Senior National Team in 2016 and played in some exhibition games. She was a part of the 2017 squad that defended their Gold Medal at the 2017 FIBA AmeriCup tournament. In 2018, she helped Canada to a 7th place finish at the FIBA World Cup, as well in 2019, winning silver at the FIBA AmeriCup.

On June 29, Carleton was named to the 2020 Canadian National Team that competed at the 2020 Olympics. This marks the first time in her career that she will compete at the Olympics.

WNBA

Connecticut Sun (2019)
Carleton was drafted in the Second Round of the 2019 WNBA Draft – 21st Overall – by the Connecticut Sun. She ultimately made the Opening Day Roster, but was later released after just four games.

Minnesota Lynx (2019-Present)
On August 22, Carleton signed a 7-day contract with the Minnesota Lynx, followed by a contract for the remainder of the 2019 season.

Carleton made the Lynx roster for the 2020 season, and became a key part of the team – filling in for the injured Sylvia Fowles. Carleton became the third WNBA player in history to score 25 or more points and have more than five rebounds in her first WNBA start in the August 5, 2020, game for the Minnesota Lynx against the New York Liberty. She scored 25 points, had seven rebounds and three assists. Carleton started in place of Sylvia Fowles, who was out with a calf injury.

WNBA career statistics

Regular season

|-
| style="text-align:left" | 2019
| style="text-align:left" | Connecticut
| 4 || 0 || 7.3 || .000 || .000 || .000 || 0.8 || 0.3 || 0.0 || 0.0 || 0.3 || 0.0
|-
| style="text-align:left" | 2019
| style="text-align:left" | Minnesota
| 4 || 0 || 2.8 || .500 || .500 || .000 || 0.3 || 0.0 || 0.0 || 0.0 || 0.0 || 0.8
|-
| style="text-align:left" | 2020
| style="text-align:left" | Minnesota
| 22 || 15 || 25.8 || .520 || .457 || .647 || 3.6 || 2.5 || 0.7 || 0.0 || 1.8 || 6.6
|-
| style="text-align:left" | 2021
| style="text-align:left" | Minnesota
| 32 || 10 || 19.3 || .401 || .365 || .800 || 2.3 || 1.5 || 0.8 || 0.2 || 0.8 || 4.8
|-
| style="text-align:left" | 2022
| style="text-align:left" | Minnesota
| 36 || 2 || 16.8 || .403 || .354 || .731 || 2.1 || 1.1 || 0.4 || 0.1 || 0.6 || 4.3
|-
| align="left" | Career
| align="left" | 4  years, 2 teams
| 98 || 27 || 18.7 || .428 || .379 || .716 || 2.4 || 1.4 || 0.6 || 0.1 || 0.8 || 4.7

Postseason

|-
| style="text-align:left" | 2020
| style="text-align:left" | Minnesota
| 4 || 3 || 29.5 || .500 || .538 || .000 || 3.8 || 2.5 || 1.3 || 0.0 || 0.8 || 6.3
|-
| style="text-align:left" | 2021
| style="text-align:left" | Minnesota
| 1 || 0 || 15.0 || .000 || .000 || .000 || 0.0 || 2.0 || 0.0 || 0.0 || 0.0 || 0.0
|-
| style="text-align:left" | Career
| style="text-align:left" |2 year, 1 team
| 5 || 3|| 26.6 || .450 || .538 || .000 || 3.0 || 2.4 || 1.0 || 0.0 || 0.6 || 5.0

References

External links

Iowa State Cyclones bio

1997 births
Living people
All-American college women's basketball players
Basketball players at the 2020 Summer Olympics
Basketball people from Ontario
Canadian expatriate basketball people in the United States
Canadian women's basketball players
Connecticut Sun draft picks
Connecticut Sun players
Guards (basketball)
Iowa State Cyclones women's basketball players
Minnesota Lynx players
Olympic basketball players of Canada
Sportspeople from Chatham-Kent
Townsville Fire players